Tritaea or Tritaia, also Tritea, was a town of ancient Phocis. During the Greco-Persian Wars, the army of Xerxes I burned the town in 480 BC. Strabo distinguishes it from the Achaean town of the same name. 

Its location is unknown.

References

Populated places in ancient Phocis
Former populated places in Greece
Lost ancient cities and towns